Parul Institute of Medical Sciences and Research is a medical college located in Vadodara, Gujarat. The college imparts the degree Bachelor of Medicine and Surgery (MBBS). Nursing and para-medical courses are also offered. The college is affiliated to Parul University and is recognised by Medical Council of India. The selection to the college is done on the basis of merit through National Eligibility and Entrance Test. Yearly undergraduate student intake is 150.

Courses
Parul Institute of Medical Sciences and Research undertakes education and training of students MBBS courses. This college is offering 150 MBBS seats from 2019 of which 85% Seats are of state quota and 15% is for Nation Counselling.

References

External links 
 https://paruluniversity.ac.in/pimsr/

Medical colleges in Gujarat